Cuauhtémoc Blanco Bravo (born 17 January 1973) is a Mexican politician and former professional footballer who is the current Governor of Morelos under the coalition Juntos Haremos Historia. He formerly served as the municipal president of Cuernavaca, Morelos. As a footballer, Blanco was known for his attacking ability and played most of his career as a deep-lying forward and his last years as an attacking midfielder. Blanco is considered to be one of the greatest Mexican footballers of all time, as well as one of the best penalty takers of all time.

Early life 
Blanco was born in Mexico City, in the district of Tlatilco, but grew up in Tepito. Born to Faustino Blanco and Hortensia Bravo, he was named after the last Aztec emperor Cuauhtémoc, in which the name means "one who has descended like an eagle".

Football career

Beginnings
Blanco started his career with América in 1992, where he won various awards, both team-based and individual, and had various loan stints with Necaxa, Spanish club Real Valladolid, and Veracruz. In 2007, he joined the Chicago Fire, with a loan stint with Santos Laguna for the 2008 Apertura championship. In 2010, he returned to Mexico to trek throughout various teams, joining Veracruz again, Irapuato, Dorados, and Puebla-based teams Lobos BUAP and Puebla, where he retired with the latter in 2015. The following year, he came out of retirement to officially end his career with América.

Club career

Club América 

Having played most of his career in América, with 333 appearances and 135 goals, Blanco has become an idol to the club's supporters and an important figure in the history of the team.

Blanco made his debut in the Mexican Primera División in 1992 at the age of 19 with América. He won his first Golden Boot with 16 goals in the Winter 1998 season for Las Aguilas. He was loaned for Winter 1997 and Summer 1998 at Necaxa, in which he scored 13 goals in 28 appearances. Blanco was later loaned to Real Valladolid of La Liga for the 2000–01 season. However, he suffered a broken leg while on international duty which kept out of the side for six months. Blanco returned to Valladolid for another loan spell the following season, but he struggled with homesickness and regaining his form. He had a knack for scoring great goals in La Liga, with most notable, a free-kick against Real Madrid at the Santiago Bernabéu Stadium, he returned to Mexico.

Blanco spent the 2004 Apertura season with Veracruz, where they ended up winning their group, but were defeated in the playoffs by UNAM. Blanco was a popular player during his time there. In May 2005, Blanco won his first club championship as a player, leading Club América to its tenth league title, when Club América defeated U.A.G. by an aggregate score of 7–4 (1–1, 6–3). In the next three consecutive years between 2005 and 2007, he was awarded the MVP.

He scored his final goal during the championship final against Pachuca in 2007.

Chicago Fire 

On 2 April 2007, Blanco ventured on to Major League Soccer in the United States and signed with Chicago Fire. He was welcomed by 5,000 fans at Toyota Park as he conducted interviews with the media, signed autographs and greeted with fans.

He was later voted as a finalist for both the MVP and Newcomer of the Year awards in 2007. Blanco was the 2007 Goal of the Year winner, for his goal against Real Salt Lake.

Blanco was the second-highest paid player in Major League Soccer, after LA Galaxy midfielder David Beckham, earning $2.7 million a year. Once again, he was a finalist for the MVP of the year award.

On 24 July 2008, in the All-Stars Game against West Ham United, Blanco won the MVP award with one assist and one goal, a game in which he only played 46 minutes. The MLS All-stars won 3–2.

Santos Laguna (loan) 
On 19 November 2008, it was announced that Santos Laguna signed Blanco on a loan to play only for the Apertura 2008 championship, after the injury of their Ecuadorian striker Christian Benítez. Blanco was formally presented to the press the next day, wearing the number 9 jersey, and stated that he looked forward to giving Santos a back-to-back championship. On 29 November 2008, Blanco scored his first goal with Santos, a penalty in the second leg of the championship quarter-finals against San Luis.

Later career 

In October 2009, Blanco announced he would not be renewing his contract with Chicago Fire and would instead sign with Veracruz of the Ascenso MX beginning in January 2010. However, after 6 months with Veracruz he left for Irapuato. Led by Blanco, Irapuato won the 2011 Clausura, but the team failed to advance to the Primera División, losing to Tijuana in the promotional final.

In December 2011, Blanco joined Dorados de Sinaloa of Liga de Ascenso. During Apertura 2012, Blanco won the Copa MX with Dorados. Despite Blanco announcing he would retire after the end of 2012, he changed his mind and played for another six months with Dorados. However, after the tournament ended, he did not renew his contract and was released from the team in June 2013.

Blanco signed for Lobos BUAP for the Apertura 2013 Liga de Ascenso season. After one year with the club, he did not renew his contract with BUAP and was released from the club at the end of the season, in which the club failed to qualify for the play-offs.

After considering retirement, Blanco signed with Puebla for one last season in the Liga MX. On 21 April 2015, he played in the Clausura's Copa MX final against Guadalajara, coming off the bench. Puebla went on to win the cup, and sent Blanco off as a champion in what was supposed to be the final game of his career.

On 22 February 2016, a month into his political career, it was announced that Blanco would participate in an official Liga MX match during the Week 9 of Clausura 2016 for the club that started his career, Club América. It would allow him to officially end his career, while playing for the club. On 5 March, Blanco started the match wearing a number 100 jersey, and played 36 minutes for América at the Estadio Azteca in a match against Morelia, before being replaced by Darwin Quintero. During the match, Blanco demonstrated his signature move the Cuauhtemiña, and had two shots on goal, one of which hit the crossbar from the outside of the penalty box. The match was eventually won by América, 4–1.

International career 
Blanco represented Mexico from 1995 to 2010 (with a special appearance in 2014). He was capped 120 times, and scored 38 goals; he is the third highest goalscorer for his country. He is the only Mexican to have won Confederations Cup awards, being awarded the Silver Ball and Silver Boot at the 1999 Confederations Cup after a first-place finish on home soil, until Oswaldo Sánchez's Golden Glove award in 2005. In 2010, he became the first Mexican to score at three World Cup tournaments, a feat later equalled by Rafael Márquez and Javier Hernández, appearing in the 1998, 2002, and 2010 editions of the tournament.

Blanco made his debut with the senior national team under Bora Milutinovic in a friendly match against Uruguay on 1 February 1995. Blanco has played for Mexico at three World Cups; he was part of the squad at France 1998, Korea-Japan 2002 and South Africa 2010. He was also a member of the team that won the Confederations Cup in 1999 where he was the tournament's leading scorer with six goals, including the winning goal at the Estadio Azteca against Brazil in the final. He was awarded the "Silver Shoe" and "Silver Ball" for outstanding player of the tournament. Blanco holds the record along with Brazilian Ronaldinho as the highest scoring players in the Confederations Cup with nine goals, three in 1997 and six in 1999.

In the selection for the final 23-man squad for the 2006 FIFA World Cup in Germany, then national team coach Ricardo La Volpe left Blanco out of the team. While the ostensible reason given was that Blanco was frequently injured and not in good form, some people considered this to be a consequence of the previous year's constant bickering, due to on-going personal problems between coach and player.

Blanco became part of the squad that played the 2007 CONCACAF Gold Cup, scoring one penalty goal, and the 2007 Copa América, where he scored 2 goals also from penalty kicks. On 13 September 2008, he earned his 100th cap for his country in its 2–1 World Cup qualifier victory over Canada at Tuxtla Gutiérrez, coming on with only 15 seconds left in regulation time. After the match, he announced his retirement from international football.

Blanco announced his return to the national team in May 2009. He became a regular member of returning coach Javier Aguirre's squad, playing in all the games throughout the Hexagonal of the World Cup Qualifying. Since then, Blanco has become an important factor in Mexico's team regaining form and confidence.

On 10 October 2009, Blanco provoked the first opposition own goal and scored the second goal in a 4–1 victory over El Salvador to help Mexico clinch a spot in the 2010 World Cup. On 17 June 2010, he scored a penalty in the 78th minute of the 2–0 win against France at the World Cup's second round of group stage matches in South Africa. With this goal he became the first Mexican to score a goal in three World Cup tournaments and the third-oldest goalscorer in World Cup history.

Blanco played a tribute game in 2014 against Israel at the Estadio Azteca, which symbolized his official retirement from international football. Mexico went on to win the match 3–0.

Player profile

Style of play 

Blanco is considered to be one of the greatest Mexican footballers of all time, as well as one of the best penalty takers of all time, having scored 71 out of 73 penalties in his career, giving him a 97.26% success rate form the spot.

His brash, aggressive, and confrontative playing style is reflected both on and off the field, pulling ingenious plays and being combative against the press, players, and coaches alike.

Cuauhtemiña 
Blanco is also remembered for the Cuauhtemiña, or Blanco Trick, which he performed notably at the 1998 World Cup. In the trick, when two or more opposition players are trying to take the ball from him, he traps the ball between his feet and jumps through the defenders – releasing the ball in the air and landing with it under control as he leaves the opposition players behind. The trick is easy to perform but is eye-catching and has been incorporated as a special skill into the FIFA series of football video games.

Celebration 
Blanco himself has accepted on Mexican television and to the press that his goal celebration is an imitation of the "Archer" celebration created by former Atletico de Madrid striker Kiko Narvaez. In a 2005 interview with Mexican newspaper El Universal, Blanco explains that while watching a Spanish league game accompanied by his teammate Germán Villa, both players agreed to celebrate their next goal by imitating the "Archer" gesture. In the end, only Blanco did it, and jokingly reprimanded Villa for not keeping his word. However, the Chicago Fire official website claimed that Blanco celebrates scoring a goal by acting like the Prehispanic Tlatoani Aztec emperor Cuauhtémoc, "in order to show respect for the Mexican people, and their indigenous Amerindian heritage".

Reception
Blanco is considered one of the most influential figures in recent Mexican footballing history. Tom Marshall of ESPN states "the battles, brawls, golazos, insults, intensity and passion with which Blanco [...] lived both on and off the pitch, he left a deep imprint on the Mexican game and a colorful story painted by the kind of character arguably lacking at present."

Career statistics

Club

International

International goals 
Scores and results list Mexico's goal tally first.

Filmography

Political career

Municipal president of Cuernavaca (2015–2018)
In January 2015, Blanco registered as a Social Democratic Party candidate for the municipal presidential elections of the city of Cuernavaca, the capital of the Mexican state of Morelos, and was formally nominated two months later. In the 2015 legislative elections, he won in a closely contested election, narrowly defeating Maricela Velázquez of the incumbent Institutional Revolutionary Party (PRI). In a subsequent vote recount Blanco was confirmed the winner of the municipal presidential race.

As municipal president, Blanco struggled with accusations about his residency in the city, allegations that he had accepted a bribe to run for office, and even murder. None of these allegations ever went anywhere. In June 2016, he left the Social Democratic Party and dismissed the secretary of the city council, Roberto Yañez Moreno, which marked the beginning of a dispute between Blanco and the party.

In March 2017, he joined the Social Encounter Party (PES).

Governor of Morelos (2018–present)

For the 2018 general elections, the National Regeneration Movement proposed having Senator Rabindranath Salazar Solorio as the candidate under the coalition Juntos Haremos Historia for the Governor of Morelos but PES, also part of the coalition, argued Blanco was the better choice for the coalition's candidate. In December 2015, it was determined there would be an internal election to see who would become the candidate for the coalition.

On 28 January 2018, Juntos Haremos Historia presidential candidate Andrés Manuel López Obrador announced Blanco would be the coalition's candidate after winning the nominee process against Senator Rabindranath Salazar Solorio. On 11 March 2018 he formally registered to become candidate for Governor of Morelos and on 2 April 2018, he was separated from his post as municipal president of Cuernavaca, succeeded by Denisse Arizmendi Villegas, in order to formally participate in the gubernatorial elections. Polls indicated he was in the lead.

On 1 July 2018, he won the 2018 gubernatorial elections by a landslide, becoming the first former footballer to win a state governor election in Mexico. He began his term as Governor on 1 October 2018. His greatest challenges as governor are finding adequate funding for the state university (UAEM) and resolving the high incidence of crime in the state. Only three months into his term, he was already faced with marches denouncing his administration. On 13 February 2019 Blanco formally charged his predecessor, Graco Ramirez, with organized crime, operations with resources of illicit origin, and tax fraud.

One year into his job as governor, people have begun to doubt Blanco's administration. Politically, he has had disputes with Morena and PT, partners in Juntos Haremos Historia that got him elected. He has been promoting PES, which has been dissolved on a national level but remains strong locally. Crime in on the rise, with an increase of 41% in murder, kidnapping 375%, and extorsion 680%. 80 women have been killed, 22 of which have been classified as femicide. On top of that, a tax debt of MXN $302,230 (US$15,800) from his time as a footballer was pardoned by the federal Tax Administration Service. Roberto Soto Pastor, a former collaborator of Graco Ramirezs, has sued Blanco for hiring several members of his family and friends, including: his half-brother Ulises Bravo, sister-in-law Liu León Luna, uncles Carlos Juárez López, Jaime Juárez López, and Armando Shajid Bravo López, and a close friend named Baltazar Jonathan Alegría Mejía. All receive salaries that range from MXN $45,000 to $60,000 (US$2,300 to $3,100) per month. The suit says their hiring is a violation of Código Penal de Morelos, Artículo 276 (Morelos penal code, Article 276) which prohibits nepotism. President Andrés Manuel López Obrador personally bawled Blanco out for nepotism in a meeting on 11 October. The governor denies allegations of nepotism.

On 8 January 2020, Arias Consultores released a poll that describes the best and worst governors. Sinaloa governor Quirino Ordaz Coppel is chosen best, while Puebla governor L. Miguel Barbosa Huerta was declared the worst. Cuauhtemoc Blanco was second-to-last at No. 31.

Personal life 
He was previously married to Marisela Santoyo from 1996 to 2003, with whom he has a son, Cuauhtémoc Jr., born the same year of their wedding. After their separation in 2000, Blanco had an affair with Liliana Lago, which produced a daughter, Bárbara, born in 2002. In 2015, Blanco married Natalia Rezende. The couple have a son named Roberto, born in 2016.
 
He appeared on the North American front cover of the FIFA 10 video game along with Frank Lampard and Sacha Kljestan.

Honours
América
Mexican Primera División: Clausura 2005
Campeón de Campeones: 2005
CONCACAF Champions' Cup: 1992, 2006

Dorados
Copa MX: Apertura 2012

Irapuato
Liga de Ascenso: Clausura 2011

Puebla
Copa MX: Clausura 2015

Mexico
FIFA Confederations Cup: 1999
CONCACAF Gold Cup: 1996, 1998

Individual
FIFA Confederations Cup Silver Boot: 1999
FIFA Confederations Cup Silver Ball: 1999
Mexican Player of the Year: 2001–2002
Mexican Primera División Golden Boot: Invierno 1998
Mexican Primera División Golden Ball: Invierno 1998 , 2004–05, 2006–07
MLS Player of the Month: May 2008
MLS Best XI: 2008
MLS All-Star: 2008, 2009
MLS All-Star Game MVP: 2008
MLS Goal of the Year: 2007
Tecate Athlete of the Year: 2008
Mexico Premio Nacional del Deporte: 2009
FIFA Confederations Cup All time scorer

See also
List of footballers with 100 or more international caps
Retired numbers in association football
FIFA Confederations Cup goalscorers

Notes

References

External links 

 Player stats at Federación Mexicana
 
 

1973 births
Living people
Footballers from Mexico City
Association football forwards
Liga MX players
Club América footballers
Club Necaxa footballers
Santos Laguna footballers
C.D. Veracruz footballers
Irapuato F.C. footballers
Dorados de Sinaloa footballers
Lobos BUAP footballers
Club Puebla players
La Liga players
Real Valladolid players
Major League Soccer players
Chicago Fire FC players
Major League Soccer All-Stars
Designated Players (MLS)
Mexico international footballers
FIFA Century Club
1995 King Fahd Cup players
1997 FIFA Confederations Cup players
1998 FIFA World Cup players
1999 FIFA Confederations Cup players
2002 FIFA World Cup players
1996 CONCACAF Gold Cup players
1998 CONCACAF Gold Cup players
1997 Copa América players
1999 Copa América players
2007 CONCACAF Gold Cup players
2007 Copa América players
2010 FIFA World Cup players
CONCACAF Gold Cup-winning players
FIFA Confederations Cup-winning players
Olympic footballers of Mexico
Footballers at the 1996 Summer Olympics
Mexican expatriate footballers
Expatriate footballers in Spain
Mexican expatriate sportspeople in Spain
Mexican sportsperson-politicians
Expatriate soccer players in the United States
Mexican expatriate sportspeople in the United States
Social Democratic Party (Mexico) politicians
People from Morelos
People from Cuernavaca
Governors of Morelos
Politicians from Morelos
Municipal presidents in Morelos
21st-century Mexican politicians
Pan American Games medalists in football
Pan American Games silver medalists for Mexico
Medalists at the 1995 Pan American Games
Footballers at the 1995 Pan American Games
Mexican footballers